Kreis Ostrowo was a county in the southern administrative district of Posen, in the Prussian province of Posen. It presently lies in the southern part of Polish region of Greater Poland Voivodeship.

External links

Districts of the Province of Posen